Hardscramble is the name given to an early 1800s stone structure located near Seguin, Texas, that was used as a home station by some of the earliest and most famous of Texas Rangers.

History
According to research for a Texas historical marker, Hardscramble located on 1806 Tschoepe Rd., Seguin, Texas was the home station of early Texas Rangers, Henry McCulloch and Benjamin McCulloch from 1841 until 1853.

Nathaniel Benton occupied the building in 1858 and later in 1871, it was home to Elijah Dale.

A Texas Centennial marker was placed to honor the location and its history in 1936. The old ranger station and marker still stand at the location and occasional tours can be arranged locally.

A second and older adobe Walnut Branch Ranger Station and hospital once stood at the corner of Court and Guadalupe Streets. It was used by the Caldwell, Callahan and Hays Rangers. No longer standing, it was unexpectedly razed around 2000. A city historical marker has been placed to honor and identify the location.

See also

National Register of Historic Places listings in Guadalupe County, Texas

References

External links
 National Register of Historic Places Listings, 2011

Buildings and structures in Guadalupe County, Texas
Tourist attractions in Seguin, Texas
Texas state historic sites